The following is a list of notable events and releases of the year 1882 in Norwegian music.

Events

Deaths

Births

 February
 11 – Arne Bjørndal, composer and painter (died 1965).

 July
 17 – Christian Leden, ethno-musicologist and composer (died 1957).

 September
 21 – Alf Hurum, composer and painter (died 1972).

See also
 1882 in Norway
 Music of Norway

References

 
Norwegian music
Norwegian
Music
1880s in Norwegian music